{{DISPLAYTITLE:H2Oasis Indoor Waterpark}}

H2Oasis Indoor Waterpark is a 56,000 square foot (5,200 m2) indoor water park located in Anchorage, Alaska, United States, just east of the Seward Highway at 1520 O'Malley Road. It opened in 2003 and was, at the time, the fifth largest indoor waterpark in the United States.

Rides and water features

 The Master Blaster: a 43ft high and 505ft long water-powered rollercoaster (watercoaster) 
 Open-flume body slide (orange), 43ft high
 Enclosed body slide (green)
 Wave pool, generating 3–4 foot waves
 Lazy River, encircling the park
 Pirate Ship Kiddie Pool, with seven slides and four water cannons
 Mushroom Water Drop and Beached Boat
 Alaska Hot Tub

The water temperature is kept around 84 °F (27 °C).

External links
 

Buildings and structures in Anchorage, Alaska
Economy of Anchorage, Alaska
Roadside attractions in Alaska
Tourist attractions in Anchorage, Alaska
Water parks in Alaska
2003 establishments in Alaska